Neyo may refer to:

People
 Ne-Yo (born 1979), American R&B singer, songwriter
 Commander Neyo, a fictional clone trooper character from Star Wars

Places
 Neyo (Raa Atoll), an uninhabited island in the Raa Atoll, Republic of Maldives
 Neyo (Shaviyani Atoll), an uninhabited island in the Shaviyani Atoll, Republic of Maldives

Other uses
 Neyo language, a Kru language of Ivory Coast, near the mouth of the Sassandra River

See also
 Neo (disambiguation)